Joanna Marguerite Wardlaw  (born 4 November 1958) is a Scottish physician, radiologist, and academic specialising in neuroradiology and pathophysiology. Wardlaw worked as a junior doctor before specialising as a radiologist. She continues to practice medicine as an Honorary Consultant Neuroradiologist with NHS Lothian. She has spent her entire academic career at the University of Edinburgh.

Early life and education
Wardlaw was born on 4 November 1958 in London, England. She was educated at Park School, an all-girls school in Glasgow, Scotland. She studied medicine at the University of Edinburgh, graduating with a first class Bachelor of Science (BSc) degree in 1979, and Bachelor of Medicine, Bachelor of Surgery (MBChB) in 1982. She later undertook research for a Doctor of Medicine (MD) degree, completing it in 1994. Her doctoral thesis concerned the pathophysiology and treatment of ischaemic stroke, and was titled "Imaging and treatment of acute ischaemic stroke: the application and verification of non-invasive imaging techniques in the investigation and treatment of acute ischaemic stroke".

Career and research
Having worked as a junior doctor, Wardlaw specialised as a radiologist. In 1986 she became a Member of the Royal Colleges of Physicians of the United Kingdom (MRCP), and in 1988 a Fellow of both the Royal College of Physicians (FRCP) and the Royal College of Radiologist (FRCR). From 1992 to 1994 she worked as a consultant neuroradiologist at the Institute of Neurological Sciences in Glasgow (now part of Queen Elizabeth University Hospital). Since 1994 she has been an honorary consultant neuroradiologist with NHS Lothian.

From 1994 to 1998, Wardlaw was a MRC senior lecturer at the University of Edinburgh. In 1997 or 1998, she established the Brain Imaging Research Centre at the university, now grouped with the Clinical Research Imaging Centre into Edinburgh Imaging and continues to serve as its director. She was a Reader from 1998 to 2001. She has been Head of the Division of Neuroimaging since 2001. She was appointed to a personal chair as Professor of Applied Neuroimaging in 2002. She was the founding director of the Scottish Imaging Network: A Platform for Scientific Excellence (SINAPSE), leading the organisation until 2010.

Wardlaw is recognised as an expert in brain blood vessel diseases and neuroimaging. Her current research is focused on the prevention, diagnosis, and treatment of strokes, particularly cerebral small vessel diseases. She is also interested in the use of imaging in pathophysiology.

Awards and honours
In 2005, Wardlaw was elected a Fellow of the Academy of Medical Sciences (FMedSci). In 2011 she was elected a Fellow of the Royal Society of Edinburgh (FRSE), Scotland's national academy of science and letters. She was made a Fellow of the American Heart Association in 2014. In the 2016 New Year Honours, she was appointed a Commander of the Order of the British Empire (CBE) "for services to neuroimaging and clinical science".

In 2008, Wardlaw was awarded the President's Medal of the British Society of Neuroradiologists. In May 2017, she was awarded the Presidential Award of the European Stroke Organisation. In 2018, she received both the Karolinska Stroke Award for Lifetime Contribution to Excellence in Advancing Knowledge in Stroke and the American Stroke Associations' William M. Feinberg Award for Excellence in Clinical Stroke.

Selected works

References

1958 births
Living people
20th-century Scottish medical doctors
21st-century Scottish medical doctors
Scottish women medical doctors
British radiologists
Academics of the University of Edinburgh
Commanders of the Order of the British Empire
Fellows of the Academy of Medical Sciences (United Kingdom)
Fellows of the Royal Society of Edinburgh
Medical doctors from Glasgow
Alumni of the University of Edinburgh
Fellows of the Royal College of Radiologists
Fellows of the Royal College of Physicians
20th-century women physicians
21st-century women physicians
Women radiologists
20th-century Scottish women